Max Scharping (born August 10, 1996) is an American football offensive guard for the Cincinnati Bengals of the National Football League (NFL). He played college football at Northern Illinois, and played high school football at Green Bay Southwest High School.

College career
Coming out of Green Bay Southwest High School, Scharping chose Northern Illinois out of approximately ten scholarship offers. He started four years at NIU, mainly playing tackle positions on either side of the offensive line but sometimes playing offensive guard as well. Scharping made First-team All-Mid-American Conference his sophomore (2016), junior (2017) and senior (2018) seasons. Analysts noted his strength as a strong suit in college play. Scharping was invited to the 2019 Senior Bowl after his senior season; he only stayed at school to win the MAC championship, a goal which he accomplished.

Professional career

At the 2019 NFL Scouting Combine, Scharping made 27 reps on the bench press.

Houston Texans
Scharping was selected by the Houston Texans in the second round (55th overall) of the 2019 NFL Draft. After starting the year as a backup, he was named the starting left guard in Week 3, and started the final 14 games.

Scharping was placed on the reserve/COVID-19 list by the team on October 28, 2020, and activated on November 10.

On August 30, 2022, Scharping was waived by the Texans.

Cincinnati Bengals
On August 31, 2022, Scharping was claimed off waivers by the Cincinnati Bengals. He would be named the starting right guard in the team's 2022 Wild Card and Divisional round playoff games due to starter Alex Cappa suffering an ankle injury in their Week 18 game against the Baltimore Ravens.

References

External links
 Northern Illinois Huskies bio
 

1996 births
Living people
Players of American football from Wisconsin
Sportspeople from Green Bay, Wisconsin
American football offensive tackles
Northern Illinois Huskies football players
Houston Texans players
Cincinnati Bengals players